The Graduate School of Arts and Sciences is a graduate school at Georgetown University in Washington, D.C., United States. Its offices are in the historic Car Barn building on the edge of campus.

History
The graduate program was first founded in 1820, when Georgetown College graduates expressed the desire for continued studies. The school offered its first graduate degree in 1821. The school existed independently from 1855 until the end of the American Civil War, when low student numbers forced its suspension. The school was reestablished in 1891, conferring its first doctoral degree in 1897.

Programs
The school is currently the largest graduate school at Georgetown and offers 46 programs in 34 departments.

List of deans

References

Citations

Sources

External links
Official site

Georgetown University schools
Educational institutions established in 1820
Liberal arts colleges at universities in the United States